Bridoux is a French surname.  Notable people with the surname include:

 Eugène Bridoux (1888–1955), French general
 François-Augustin Bridoux (1813–1892), French engraver
 Léonce Bridoux (1852–1890), French Roman Catholic bishop

French-language surnames